John Frye (1933–2005) was a footballer who played as an inside forward in the Scottish Football League for Hibernian, St Mirren, Queen of the South, Hamilton Academical and Stranraer, and in the Football League for Sheffield Wednesday and Tranmere Rovers.

References

1933 births
2005 deaths
Footballers from North Ayrshire
Association football inside forwards
Scottish footballers
Ardrossan Winton Rovers F.C. players
Hibernian F.C. players
St Mirren F.C. players
Sheffield Wednesday F.C. players
Tranmere Rovers F.C. players
Queen of the South F.C. players
Hamilton Academical F.C. players
Stranraer F.C. players
Scottish Football League players
English Football League players
People from Ardrossan